Robert Clive Cleghorn (4 July 1937 – 28 July 2021) was a South African radio, film, television and theatre actor and director best known for his performances in the TV soap operas The Villagers and Isidingo.

Biography
Clive Scott was born in Parkview, Johannesburg, South Africa, in 1937, as Robert Clive Cleghorn and went to school in Springs. After the death of his father, his mother settled in Cape Town, completed his schooling at St. George's Grammar School becoming Head Boy in 1955. His earlier adult career was in banking including a two-year stint in Rhodesia. Having enough of banking he left for the United Kingdom for three months but ended up staying twelve years. He studied acting at the Webber Douglas Academy of Dramatic Art before taking up acting at various repertory theatres in England. In 1965, Scott performed in The Mousetrap in London. Returning to South Africa in 1970, Scott appeared in one of the first South African television dramas in 1976, The Villagers as Ted Dixon, a series of 76 episodes over three years, and this popular series made him a household name. He has also starred in a number of South African television advertisements. He was also a public speaker and had an interest in esoteric matters. He died on 28 July 2021 at the age of 84.

Filmography

Films

Television

References

External links 
 

1937 births
2021 deaths
South African male television actors
South African male film actors
South African male stage actors
White South African people
Alumni of the Webber Douglas Academy of Dramatic Art
People from Johannesburg